Girdle Ness Lighthouse (or Girdleness Lighthouse) is situated near Torry Battery on the Girdle Ness peninsula just south of the entrance to Aberdeen's harbour, in Scotland. It is an active light, managed by the Northern Lighthouse Board.

Description
The tower is a tapering cylinder, painted white, with a watch room about a third of the way up. The lantern is black and there is a gallery. Adjacent is single-storey keepers' accommodation (which has been sold off) and ancillary buildings. DGPS is provided via two radio towers. The light was automated in 1991 and is continuously monitored on-line from the Northern Lighthouse Board headquarters in Edinburgh. There is no public access to the lighthouse. A racon was installed after 1968. It is a Category A listed building.

History
In 1813 the whaler Oscar was blown ashore in a storm into Greyhope Bay, at the entrance to Aberdeen Harbour. Despite rescue attempts only two men of the forty four on board were saved. The disaster had nothing to do with the lack of a light – the crew were drunk and incapable – but there were strong calls for a lighthouse to be built on the headland above the bay and this was achieved twenty years later.

For the construction, the engineer was Robert Stevenson and the principal contractor was James Gibb. The construction was completed in 1833 and the light was first lit on 15 October– Alexander Slight became the resident inspector and Alan Stevenson the resident engineer.
Originally sperm oil was used in eighteen Argand burners giving a fixed light at the focus of a  diameter silvered-copper parabolic reflector. In 1847 a dioptric light was installed and the previous lantern was transferred to Inchkeith Lighthouse. In 1870 paraffin was used experimentally. In 1890 the light was replaced by a single 200,000 candlepower revolving light. Until that time there had been a second level of thirteen lights with a similar reflector at the height of the watch room so as to display white lights at two levels.  As a member of a Royal Commission the Astronomer Royal, George Airy, visited in 1860. He said it was "the best lighthouse that I have seen".

Foghorn

It was nicknamed the "Torry Coo" (alluding to the "Turra Coo") because it sounded like a coo – one that could be heard twenty miles away. Although it is no longer used, the siren has been preserved.

See also 
 , Royal Navy missile trials ship, used for development of the Seaslug missile.

References

Lighthouses completed in 1833
Category A listed buildings in Aberdeen
Category A listed lighthouses
1833 establishments in Scotland
Lighthouses in Scotland
Buildings and structures in Aberdeen
Works of Robert Stevenson (civil engineer)